Teymurabad (also Romanized as Teymūrābād) is a village in Qarah Quyun-e Shomali Rural District, in the Central District of Showt County, West Azerbaijan Province, Iran. At the 2006 census, its population was 302, in 72 families.

References 

Populated places in Showt County